Eastside Projects is an artist-run space in the Digbeth area of Birmingham, England. It is a free public space that is imagined and organised by artists, and includes galleries and studios. It commissions and presents experimental contemporary art exhibitions and proposes ways in which art may be useful to society. It is organised by Simon Bloor, Tom Bloor, Céline Condorelli, Ruth Claxton, James Langdon, and Gavin Wade, who first conceived and now runs the space. The gallery has a programme for high-profile exhibitions and events.

Group exhibitions have featured artists and organisations such as Art & Language, Mel Bochner and Grizedale Arts, while past solo shows include Liam Gillick, Shezad Dawood, Carey Young, William Pope.L, and Dan Graham. Since the space opened in 2008, it has made a substantial contribution to Birmingham and its burgeoning reputation as a centre for contemporary art; through Extra Special People, the We Are Eastside Consortium, and other partnerships, it has successfully supported the developing ecology of artists, projects, and independent culture in the surrounding area in order to enrich the life of the city and region.

Background 

The gallery opened on 26 September 2008 with its inaugural exhibition, "This is the Gallery and the Gallery is Many Things". Since its launch, the exhibition programme has featured a series of exhibitions that use the mode of a medium to explore it from within: Sculpture Show" (2009), "Abstract Cabinet Show" (2009), "Curtain Show" (2010), "Book Show" (2010), "Narrative Show" (2011), and "Painting Show" (20112012). Led by Gavin Wade, the space is run and staffed entirely by practicing artists and designers who combine careers within the UK and international art worlds with working for Eastside Projects. They, and the artists who work with them, are drawn to the unique environment that has been created in an old industrial space on Heath Mill Lane.

From the quirky wooden office (which is also an artwork entitled "Pleasure Island" by Heather and Ivan Morison), to newly installed walls borrowed from the Vienna Secession, to regularly changing temporary display structures which re-use and re-work previous exhibits, Eastside Projects challenges what an art gallery can be, and has transformed over time into an evolving space which wears its history and influences on its sleeve. In 2011, Eastside Projects was accepted into Arts Council England's National Portfolio, securing funding for a further three years from 2012. The gallery has also received additional funding from a Paul Hamlyn Breakthrough Award and works in partnership with Birmingham City University who support the gallery through project funding and the use of equipment or facilities. Eastside Projects is a not-for-profit company limited by guarantee.

Long-term works 
Eastside Projects is a new model for a gallery, where space and programme are intertwined; it is a complex evolving programme of works and events, starting from radical historical positions. Work may remain and be responded to, and the gallery itself is an artwork. The artist-run space has established itself as being good for the public eye as well as tourists visiting the area. There are a number of long-term works located within the gallery, which formed elements of previous exhibitions. "Local Myths", a totemic sculpture by Jennifer Tee has been a permanent fixture in the gallery since 2010. The handle of the door to the street is a work entitled "Wilkommen. Bienvenue. Welcome. C'mon in." by Matthew Harrison. The gallery office is a structure, "Pleasure Island", originally designed by Heather and Ivan Morison for the Welsh Pavilion at the Venice Biennale in 2007.

Extra Special People 
Extra Special People (ESP) is the associate membership scheme at Eastside Projects. ESP supports the development of work, ideas, connections and careers and programmes a huge range of events for artists, writers, curators and those with a more general interest in contemporary art. ESP organises regular salon events which can take the form of talks, discussions, screenings and social events which are free to members and open to the public for a pay-on-the-door price. There are exclusive bursaries and opportunities available to members and ESP also offer practical workshops, practice-led group, as well as 1-2-1 advice, discussions, support and mentoring surgeries.

References

External links 
 Eastside Projects website

Art galleries established in 2008
Art museums and galleries in Birmingham, West Midlands
Culture in Birmingham, West Midlands
Buildings and structures in Birmingham, West Midlands
2008 establishments in England